William R. Campbell (born 1900, date of death unknown) was a Scottish professional footballer who played for Cowdenbeath, Alloa Athletic, Huddersfield Town &  Manchester City. He was born in Dunfermline.

1900 births
Year of death missing
Alloa Athletic F.C. players
Cowdenbeath F.C. players
English Football League players
Huddersfield Town A.F.C. players
Manchester City F.C. players
Scottish footballers
Footballers from Dunfermline
Association football defenders